Allyn River, a perennial stream of the Hunter River catchment, is located in the Hunter region of New South Wales, Australia.

Course
Allyn River rises on Allyn Range, on the slopes of the Gondwana Rainforests Barrington Tops, west of Careys Peak, and flows generally southeast, joined by seven minor tributaries, before reaching its confluence with the Paterson River near Vacy; descending  over its  course.

The course of the river flows through World Heritage listed high elevation rainforest, noted for its Antarctic Beech; and then through lower elevation subtropical rainforest, including trees such as Red Cedar and Small leaf fig. Logging has been practiced in the area since the 1820s. In the middle course of the river, the geology includes sedimentary rocks such as the Allyn River Member.

History
The Allyn River valley is the traditional territory of the Gringai clan of the Wonnarua people, a group of Indigenous Australians.

See also

 List of rivers of Australia
 Rivers of New South Wales

References

External links
 

Rivers of the Hunter Region
Hunter River (New South Wales)